The South Dakota Dept. of Transportation Bridge No. 03-327-230, in Beadle County, South Dakota near Cavour, was a Queen post pony truss bridge which was built in 1913.  It was listed on the National Register of Historic Places in 1993.

It was built by the Iowa Bridge Company. In 1993 it was the longest Queen post pony truss bridge with a known builder in South Dakota.

The bridge was removed and scrapped in 2016.

Photos

References

Pony truss bridges
Queen post truss bridges in the United States
National Register of Historic Places in Beadle County, South Dakota
Buildings and structures completed in 1913